The 2020 Orange County Board of Supervisors elections was held on March 3, 2020 as part of the primary election on March 3, 2020. Two of the five seats of the Orange County, California Board of Supervisors were up for election.

County elections in California are officially nonpartisan. A two-round system was to be used for the election, starting with the first round in March; followed by a runoff in November between the top-two candidates in each district. Runoffs are held if no candidate receives a majority in each district.

District 1
District 1 takes in western Orange County, including Santa Ana, Westminster, Garden Grove and parts of Fountain Valley. The incumbent is Andrew Do, who was re-elected with 50.2% of the vote in 2016.

Candidates
Sergio Contreras, Westminster city councilman
Andrew Do, incumbent supervisor
Kim Bernice Nguyen, Garden Grove city councilwoman
Miguel A. Pulido, mayor of Santa Ana

General election

Endorsements

Results

Runoff

Endorsements

Results

District 3
District 3 encompasses central Orange County, taking in Irvine, Orange, Tustin, Villa Park, Yorba Linda, and eastern Anaheim. The incumbent is Donald P. Wagner, who was elected with 42.0% of the vote in 2019.

Candidates
Ashleigh Aitken, attorney and member of the Orange County Fair Board
Donald P. Wagner, incumbent supervisor

General election

Results

References

External links
Official campaign websites of first district candidates
Sergio Contreras for Supervisor
Andrew Do for Supervisor

Official campaign websites of third district candidates
Ashleigh Aitken for Supervisor 
Donald Wagner for Supervisor

Orange County Board of Supervisors
Orange County Board of Supervisors 2020
Orange County Board of Supervisors